The Jezersko–Solčava is a breed of domestic sheep from the eastern Alpine region of Europe. Until the outbreak of the First World War it was the most numerous sheep breed in southern Carinthia, in Friuli and in Slovenia. Its name derives from the regions of Jezersko and of Solčava, formerly in the Austrian Empire, now in Slovenia. It is raised also in parts of Austria, Germany and Italy; a small number were imported to Serbia in 1991.

History 

The traditional mountain sheep reared for hundreds of years in the Alpine region of southern Carinthia were of the primitive Zaupelschaf type, similar to the  Tiroler Steinschaf. They were frugal and hardy, and well adapted to the steep slopes and sparse pasture of the mountains, but yielded little meat and wool of coarse quality. During the eighteenth century, when wool production was the most important attribute of sheep, rams of the now-extinct Padovana breed, known for the fine quality of its wool, were brought from the Italian peninsula and cross-bred with the local ewes. The first description of the resulting breed dates from 1844. From there, the breed spread widely, throughout Carinthia, through much of Austria-Hungary, and into the Bavarian Alps. The meat was in demand, and many animals were sent to Paris and to Switzerland for slaughter.

In the early twentieth century, demand for wool dropped; attempts were made to improve the meat yield of the Jezersko–Solčava by cross-breeding with the large-framed Bergamasca, a heavy meat breed from northern Italy. This had the undesirable result of lowering the quality of the wool. After the Second World War the population continued to decline, reaching a low point in the 1980s when only about 200 head remained in Austria.

At the end of 2013 the population reported from Slovenia was 17,200; Austria reported 5112–6500, Germany 727 and Italy 4973.

Characteristics 

The Jezersko–Solčava sheep has black patches around the eyes, which may give it the appearance of wearing glasses. It  has a markedly convex profile and is lop-eared; the lower part – from one to two thirds – of the ears is black. The lips and chin may be flecked with black; the coat is otherwise white. Both sexes are polled (hornless). The hooves are strong.

Use 

The wool is fine and of good quality.

Ewes lamb twice a year, with a twinning rate of 70%.

References
 

Sheep breeds
Sheep breeds originating in Slovenia
Sheep breeds originating in Austria
Sheep breeds originating in Germany
Sheep breeds originating in Italy
Animal breeds on the GEH Red List